Ohariu-Belmont was a New Zealand parliamentary electorate from 1996 to 2008.

Population centres
The 1996 election was notable for the significant change of electorate boundaries, based on the provisions of the Electoral Act 1993. Because of the introduction of the mixed-member proportional (MMP) electoral system, the number of electorates had to be reduced, leading to significant changes. More than half of the electorates contested in 1996 were newly constituted, and most of the remainder had seen significant boundary changes. In total, 73 electorates were abolished, 29 electorates were newly created (including Ohariu-Belmont), and 10 electorates were recreated, giving a net loss of 34 electorates.

The electorate covered the northern suburbs of the city of Wellington, i.e. Ngaio, Tawa, Khandallah and Johnsonville, and also the adjacent suburb of Belmont in the Western Hutt Valley.

History
It replaced , but also included Belmont so was renamed Ohariu-Belmont.

Members of Parliament

Key

1United New Zealand joined with Future New Zealand to become United Future New Zealand, in 2002.

List MPs
Members of Parliament elected from party lists in elections where that person also unsuccessfully contested the Ohariu-Belmont electorate. Unless otherwise stated, all MPs terms began and ended at general elections.

1Chauvel entered Parliament on 1 August 2006, following the resignation of Jim Sutton.
2Shanks entered Parliament on 7 February 2007, following the resignation of Don Brash.

Election results

2005 election

2002 election

1999 election

References

Historical electorates of New Zealand
Politics of the Wellington Region
1996 establishments in New Zealand
2008 disestablishments in New Zealand